Ramsvika may refer to one of the following locations:

Places
Ramsvika, Vestvågøy, a village in Vestvågøy municipality in Nordland county, Norway
Ramsvika, Øksnes, a village in Øksnes municipality in Nordland county, Norway
Ramsvika, Trøndelag, a village in Namsos municipality in Trøndelag county, Norway